Urban Studies is a monthly peer-reviewed academic journal covering the field of urban studies. The editor-in-chief is Andrew Cumbers (University of Glasgow), and its three managing editors are Jon Bannister, Yingling Fan and Tony O'Sullivan. It was established in 1964 and is published by SAGE Publications on behalf of Urban Studies Journal Ltd.

The journal is also closely connected with the Urban Studies Foundation, a charity which awards grants to researchers in the wider urban studies field.

Abstracting and indexing
The journal is abstracted and indexed in Scopus and the Social Sciences Citation Index. According to the Journal Citation Reports, its two-year impact factor is 4.663, ranking it 32nd out of 125 journals in the category "Environmental Studies" and 7th out of 43 journals in the category "Urban Studies".

References

External links
 

SAGE Publishing academic journals
English-language journals
Urban studies and planning journals
Monthly journals
Publications established in 1964